On The Table is an initiative started by The Chicago Community Trust. On a single day individual hosts invite a small group of people (6-12) to a conversation over food. Hosts have included civic leaders and community organizations, but anyone can register to host, and who is invited is entirely up to the host. Ideally those invited do not know each other well except for their connection to the host. There is no agenda or pre-determined outcome of the conversation except to catalog what was discussed and what actions were suggested to address the concerns of participants. The results of the conversations are summarized and reported back to the community in a formal report.

The Chicago Community Trust created and organized the first On the Table event in 2014 and since then more than 30 communities have held On the Table events. More than 250,000 people have participated.

History 
The Chicago Community Trust held a series of “Chicago Dinners” in the late 1990s and early 2000s in partnership with the Human Relations Commission, bringing together area residents from different races and ethnicities to talk about race relations. In 2014, the Trust organized the first ever On the Table to engage everyday residents in discussing ways to improve the community. More than 11,500 people participated and it has continued in Chicago every year since.

In the following year 25,000 participated, then 55,000 in 2016, and 100,000 in 2017 roughly doubling every year. In 2016, the Trust added a new component, the Acting Up awards – small financial awards to sponsor ideas discussed during On the Table conversations.

Expansion and replication 
In 2017, The John S. and James L. Knight Foundation provided $2 million in new funding to expand the program to a dozen other cities. In 2019, The Chicago Community Trust and the Knight Foundation partnered to launch the National Learning Network, a virtual learning community for foundations, civic institutions, and nonprofit leaders who have implemented or have shown interest in replicating the On the Table model.

Events

References 

Community